E.N. Sudhir (1948 – 3 July 2022), was an Indian international football player who played as a goalkeeper. He represented Goa at the Santosh Trophy and made his debut at the tournament in 1972.

Career
Sudhir made his international debut against Indonesia in Rangoon (currently Yangon) in the Olympic qualifiers in 1972. He represented India in nine matches. Sudhir was a part of the Indian squad in the 1973 Merdeka Cup and the 1974 Asian Games. At the domestic level, he played for Kerala in the Santosh Trophy in 1969 and 1970. He later switched to Goa and represented them in 1971, 1972, and 1973. He also played for Maharashtra in 1975. At the club level, Sudheer played for several clubs, including Vasco Sports Club and Mahindra & Mahindra.

Personal life and death
Sudhir suffered from gall bladder-related problems. He died on 3 July 2022.

References

1948 births
2022 deaths
Indian footballers
India international footballers
Malayali people
Footballers from Kerala
Sportspeople from Kozhikode
Association football goalkeepers
Footballers at the 1974 Asian Games
Asian Games competitors for India